Settingdown Creek is a stream in the U.S. state of Georgia. It is a tributary to the Etowah River.

The stream was named after Setten Down, a Cherokee chieftain. Variant names are "Settendown Creek", "Sitting Down Creek", "Sittingdon Creek", and "Sittingdown Creek"

References

Rivers of Georgia (U.S. state)
Rivers of Cherokee County, Georgia
Rivers of Forsyth County, Georgia